The prime d'activité (English: employment bonus) is a French social security benefit created on August 17, 2015, relative to labor relations and employment. Stemming from the fusion of the Revenu de solidarité active (RSA) and the Prime pour l'emploi (PPE), the prime d'activité supports the occupation and buying power of low-income workers, rectifying certain problems posed by both the RSA and the PPE. As of January 1, 2016, the prime d'activité is issued by Caisse d'allocations familiales and Mutualité sociale agricole (fr).

Creation and codification 

The prime d'activité was created by the August 17 law #2015-994 relative to labour relations and employment:, title IV, and took effect on January 1, 2016. It is codified in book 8 of the social security code, specifically  L 841-1 to L 847-1, R 842-1 to R 848-1 and D 843-1 to D 848-5. The provisions were finalised by simple decree (fr) #2015-1710 on the 21 December 2015 and was published in the Journal officiel de la République française on the 22 December 2016.

Objectives and motivations of the prime d'activité 

The creation of the prime d'activité is the result of several reports on two previous insufficient provisions regarding labor and low-income support, namely the RSA and the PPE.

The RSA, whose goal was to promote re-entry into the workforce without fear of earning less than unemployment benefits, was only used by a third of potential beneficiaries due to administrative complexities, fear of overcompensation (and thus repayment), and social stigma. Furthermore, in all but rare cases, the RSA was not issued to those under 25.

The PPE, a tax credit supplementing low-wage incomes, however, reached between 95% and 97% of potential beneficiaries, but allocated relatively low amounts (a monthly average of 33€ in 2014) with a one-year discrepancy in relation to employment.

The prime d'activité corrects these drawbacks. It is unconnected to the RSA and is issued monthly at a "fixed" three-month rate irrespective of any changes in employment, reducing the incidence of overcompensation, and can be claimed at age 18 with a simplified administrative process.

The objective remains to encourage re-entry into the workforce, even into low-paying positions, and supplementing low incomes.

Conditions 

All earnings cited here are legally defined in relation to SMIC (fr) and are shown in monthly net in practice. On January 1, the net monthly SMIC was 1,130€.

 General conditions: Be a national of the European Economic Area (EEA) and reside in France. For homeless individuals, selecting a place of residence at a Centre communal d'action sociale (fr) or other certified organisation.
Conditions specific to the prime d'activité: be on a regular stay in France for at least 5 years if foreign to the EEA.
Conditions for those earning less than  net per month (79.5% of SMIC): Proof of no other occupation (neither student nor apprentice).

Amount 

The prime d'activité is inversely proportional to earnings.

Example for a single childless earner in 2017

References 

Social security in France
2015 in France
Law of France